John Henry Walker (1831–1899), a pioneer Canadian engraver and illustrator, was from County Antrim in Northern Ireland and as a young boy emigrated in 1842 to Canada with his family, settling in Toronto, Upper Canada. In 1845 he was apprenticed for three years to the engraver Cyrus A. Swett, where he was trained in copper and wood engraving.

Walker provided the engravings for catalogues, government reports, advertisements and magazines such as The Canadian Illustrated News, L'Opinion Publique and Le Monde Illustré, and produced the front-cover illustration for his launching of Punch in Canada in 1849. The magazine was styled on the English Punch and failed when published by Walker as a weekly. His other short-lived humorous periodicals were The Jester, Grinchuckle and Diogenes.
He is regarded as a pioneer of political cartooning in Canada and dominated engraving in Montreal from 1845 into the 1890s. His legacy of illustrations provides a rich insight into life in Victorian Canada.

Gallery

References

External links

McCord Museum gallery of Walker's engravings

1831 births
1899 deaths
19th-century engravers
Canadian engravers
Canadian wood engravers
Canadian illustrators
19th-century Canadian painters
Canadian male painters
19th-century Canadian male artists